Şahap Sıtkı İlter (2 April 1915, in Niğde – 3 September 1991, in Istanbul), pen name Şahap Sıtkı, was a Turkish writer of novels, short stories and translator. He is better known for his short story books including: Acı, Çırılçıplak, and Bulut Gelir Pare Pare.

Sıtkı graduated from Antalya High School in 1936 and the Ankara University, Law School in 1941. After high school, he started working also while attending university and continued working until he retired in 1951.

Published works

Short Stories
Cirilciplak (1957)
Bulut Gelir Pare Pare (1958)
Gulen Ayva Ağlayan Nar (1959)
Şubat Gecesi (1964)
Acı (1970)

Novels
Gün Gormeyen Sokak (1958)
Toprak (1962)
Gökkuşağı (1965)
Horoz Değirmeni (1967) 
Kimin İçin (1967)

References

1915 births
People from Niğde
Ankara University Faculty of Law alumni
Turkish male short story writers
Turkish novelists
1991 deaths